Harriseahead is a village in the county of Staffordshire, England, just north of the Potteries (Stoke on Trent) and about  south-west of Biddulph and close to the border with Cheshire. Population details from the 2011 census can be found under Kidsgrove.

History
The etymology is unknown; although the "-head" ending of the name, from Old English heafod indicates the town's high situation in the Staffordshire Moorlands.

Mow Cop Castle is on top of a hill just under a mile north of the village. It has been in the care of the National Trust since 1937, but has a history linking it with Methodism.

The County of Staffordshire is about as far inland as any county of the United Kingdom, and covers a distance of 55 miles from North to South and 36 miles from East to West. It has been hailed as the land of Crocks and Locks due to its links with canals and the pottery industry. There are few navigable rivers, and this lack of natural waterways initially put Staffordshire at a disadvantage when compared to other English counties. The coming of the canals  was really to spur on industry and by the end of the 18th century Staffordshire sat at the economic and transport heart of the country.

The county was endowed with an abundance of minerals including copper, lead, limestone and, most importantly, coal. As the majority of minerals required firing, charcoal was initially used. As supplies became depleted, more and more coal had to be used. This had considerable effects on the developments of urban villages such as Harriseahead.

The tectonic structure within the coalfield is made up of a series of North / South folds which gave rise to many outcrops and footrail mines such as those found in Harriseahead. The coalfield is exceptionally rich in coal seams. It has been suggested that there may be up to 30 different seams with of aggregate depth of some 140 feet. The most productive seams are to be found within the Middle Coal Measures, varieties including coking coals which formed the backbone of the local iron smelting industry.

Harriseahead in 1841
The census of 1841 showed that the village of Harriseahead had a population of some 578 persons, 303 of which were male and 275 of which were females. There were 111 separate dwellings, with an average occupancy rate of 5.28 persons per dwelling. Of the population only 35.8% were in work.

Harriseahead was heavily involved with the coal mining industry for many years and now is a commuter village serving the urban conurbations of Stoke on Trent and as far away as Manchester and Birmingham. Along with other urban villages on the North Staffordshire Coalfield, the reliance on mining has been replaced, as the industry as a whole has declined both locally and nationally. The landscape still exhibits features of its former industrial heritage, including disused fustian mills the rebuilt winding house on Biddulph Road, the derelict buildings of Red Lion Pit, and the disused tramway which can be seen in the local fields.

Links with Methodism

The link with Methodism came when Hugh Bourne moved to Harriseahead in 1800, having bought an oak woodland there to supply pit props in Stonetrough Colliery and other local mines. In 1801 to 1802 he built a Methodist Chapel which became the centre of Methodist activity in that area and beyond. The Primitive Methodist movement grew out of this.

The village used to have both a Primitive and Wesleyan Methodist Chapel, however a single functioning chapel remains in the form of the Methodist Memorial Chapel found on the corner of High Street and Chapel Lane. The Chapel continues to have its annual Anniversary Sermons and Flower Festival which are well received locally.

The chapel closed in October 2018, holding a final service which was very well attended.

References

External links

Villages in Staffordshire
Borough of Newcastle-under-Lyme